"Summer Time Gone" is a song by Japanese singer-songwriter Mai Kuraki. The song was released as the fourth single from her ninth studio album, Future Kiss, on August 31, 2010 through Northern Music.

Commercial performance 
"Summer Time Gone" reached number four on the Oricon Weekly Singles Chart, selling 25,332 physical copies in its first week.

In popular culture 
"Summer Time Gone" was featured in the TV commercial for the cosmetic line, Esprique Precious by Kosé, as well as served as the theme song to the animated television series Detective Conan and Music Focus.

Track listing

Charts

Daily charts

Weekly charts

Monthly charts

Certification and sales

|-
! scope="row"| Japan (RIAJ)
| 
| 33,378 
|-
|}

External links
Mai Kuraki Official Website

2010 singles
2010 songs
Mai Kuraki songs
Case Closed songs
Song recordings produced by Daiko Nagato
Songs written by Aika Ohno
Songs written by Mai Kuraki